Jordan Lilley (born 4 September 1996) is an English professional rugby league footballer who plays as a  or  for the Bradford Bulls in the Betfred Championship. 

He spent on loan from the Leeds Rhinos at Bradford during the 2019 season.

Background
Lilley was born in Bramley, Leeds, West Yorkshire, England.

Career

Early career
Lilley started at the amateur club Stanningley ARLFC.

Leeds Rhinos
Lilley made his début for Leeds in their 2015 Super League match against Wakefield Trinity at Belle Vue. He went on to make a handful of appearances in 2015 and just missed out on a spot in the Grand Final team at the end of the season.  In 2016 Lilley became a regular in the Leeds team after Danny McGuire was injured at the start of the season.

Hunslet
Lilley was dual registered in 2015 with Hunslet Hawks in the Championship, and played four games for the club, kicking ten goals.

Bradford Bulls
He joined Bradford on a loan deal in February 2017.

Leigh Centurions
In March 2018 Lilley joined Leigh on a month loan.

Bradford Bulls
He rejoined Bradford on a year and a half loan deal before signing permanently on a two-year deal mid way through the 2019 season.

Statistics

Statistics do not include pre-season friendlies.

Honours
World Club Challenge Runners-up: 2016

References

External links
Leeds Rhinos profile
SL profile

1996 births
Living people
Bradford Bulls players
English rugby league players
Featherstone Rovers players
Hunslet R.L.F.C. players
Leeds Rhinos players
Leigh Leopards players
Rugby league five-eighths
Rugby league halfbacks
Rugby league players from Bramley